The DrugBank database is a comprehensive, freely accessible, online database containing information on drugs and drug targets created and maintained by the University of Alberta and The Metabolomics Innovation Centre located in Alberta, Canada. As both a bioinformatics and a cheminformatics resource, DrugBank combines detailed drug (i.e. chemical, pharmacological and pharmaceutical) data with comprehensive drug target (i.e. sequence, structure, and pathway) information. DrugBank has used content from Wikipedia; Wikipedia also often links to Drugbank, posing potential circular reporting issues.

The DrugBank Online website is available to the public as a free-to-access resource. However, use and re-distribution of content from DrugBank Online or the underlying DrugBank Data, in whole or part, and for any purpose requires a license. Academic users can apply for a free license for certain use cases while all other users require a paid license.

The latest release of the database (version 5.0) contains 9591 drug entries including 2037 FDA-approved small molecule drugs, 241 FDA-approved biotech (protein/peptide) drugs, 96 nutraceuticals and over 6000 experimental drugs. Additionally, 4270 non-redundant protein (i.e. drug target/enzyme/transporter/carrier) sequences are linked to these drug entries. Each DrugCard entry (Fig. 1) contains more than 200 data fields with half of the information being devoted to drug/chemical data and the other half devoted to drug target or protein data.

Four additional databases, HMDB, T3DB, SMPDB and FooDB are also part of a general suite of metabolomic/cheminformatic databases. HMDB contains equivalent information on more than 40,000 human metabolites, T3DB contains information on 3100 common toxins and environmental pollutants, SMPDB contains pathway diagrams for nearly 700 human metabolic pathways and disease pathways, while FooDB contains equivalent information on ~28,000 food components and food additives.

Version history
The first version of DrugBank was released in 2006.  This early release contained relatively modest information about 841 FDA-approved small molecule drugs and 113 biotech drugs.  It also included information on 2133 drug targets. The second version of DrugBank was released in 2009.  This greatly expanded and improved version of the database included 1344 approved small molecule drugs and 123 biotech drugs as well as 3037 unique drug targets.  Version 2.0 also included, for the first time, withdrawn drugs and illicit drugs, extensive food-drug and drug-drug interactions as well as ADMET (absorption, distribution, metabolism, excretion and toxicity) parameters.  Version 3.0 was released in 2011.  This version contained 1424 approved small molecule drugs and 132 biotech drugs as well as >4000 unique drug targets. Version 3.0 also included drug transporter data, drug pathway data, drug pricing, patent and manufacturing data as well as data on >5000 experimental drugs.  Version 4.0 was released in 2014.  This version included 1558 FDA-approved small molecule drugs, 155 biotech drugs and 4200 unique drug targets. Version 4.0 also incorporated extensive information on drug metabolites (structures and reactions), drug taxonomy, drug spectra, drug binding constants and drug synthesis information.  Table 1 provides a more complete statistical summary of the history of DrugBank’s development.

Scope and access
All data in DrugBank is derived from public non-proprietary sources. Nearly every data item is fully traceable and explicitly referenced to the original source. DrugBank data is available through a public web interface.

Users may query DrugBank in a number of ways:
Simple text queries of the entire textual component of the database are supported. Clicking on the Browse button generates a tabular synopsis of DrugBank's content. This view allows users to casually scroll through the database or re-sort its contents.
 Clicking on a given DrugCard button brings up the full data content for the corresponding drug. A complete explanation of all the DrugCard fields and sources is given there.
 The PharmaBrowse button allows users to browse through drugs as grouped by their indication. This is particularly useful for pharmacists and physicians, but also for pharmaceutical researchers looking for potential drug leads.
The ChemQuery button allows users to draw (using ChemAxon applets) or write (as a SMILES string) a chemical compound and to search DrugBank for chemicals similar or identical to the query compound.
 The TextQuery button supports a more sophisticated text search (partial word matches, case sensitive, misspellings, etc.) of the text portion of DrugBank.
 The SeqSearch button allows users to conduct BLAST (protein) sequence searches of the 18,000 sequences contained in DrugBank. Both single and multiple sequence (i.e. whole proteome) BLAST queries are supported.
 The Data Extractor button opens an easy-to-use relational query search tool that allows users to select or search over various combinations of subfields. The Data Extractor is the most sophisticated search tool for DrugBank.

Users may track the latest news about DrugBank through regular news feeds through its website as well as through Twitter and Facebook.

See also

 ChEMBL
 Drug metabolism
 HMDB
 KEGG
 List of biological databases
 Pharmacology
 SMPDB
 T3DB
 Therapeutic Targets Database

References

Chemical databases
Metabolomic databases
Human drug metabolites
Biological databases